The Treaty of Paris concluded the Franco-Flemish War. It was signed on May 5, 1320 by Philippe V of France and Robert III of Flanders. The original is preserved at the Departmental archives of Nord.

Sources 

 

1300s in France
Paris (1320)
14th century in Paris
14th-century military history of France
1320s treaties